Minicorona is a genus of moths belonging to the family Tineidae. It contains only one species, Minicorona tricarpa, which is found in South Africa.

References

Endemic moths of South Africa
Myrmecozelinae
Monotypic moth genera